Richard Terrell Davis (born May 18, 1953) is a former  National Football League defensive back who played from 1975 to 1978 for the Cincinnati Bengals, Tampa Bay Buccaneers and Kansas City Chiefs. He attended Jess Lanier High School, college at the University of Alabama and was the Cincinnati Bengals 8th round pick in the 1975 NFL Draft.

References

Living people
1953 births
Cincinnati Bengals players
Tampa Bay Buccaneers players
Kansas City Chiefs players
American football defensive backs
Alabama Crimson Tide football players
Players of American football from Birmingham, Alabama